Bonnyton is a rural area of Old Rayne in the Garioch area of Aberdeenshire, Scotland.

Bonnyton is a small secluded hamlet comprising seven houses, at the end of a no through road. 
Elevation approx. 500 feet.    South facing views towards the Bennachie range.
It is situated a mile and half from the Main A96 Aberdeen/Inverness trunk road.
The local village with shops is at Insch

It is surrounded by the farms of Loanhead, Lathries, Oxenloan and St Cloud. A caravan site is situated in the area.

References

Villages in Aberdeenshire